Gerald Norman Springer (born February 13, 1944) is an American broadcaster, journalist, actor, producer, former lawyer, and politician. Springer served as the 56th Mayor of Cincinnati from 1977 to 1978. He is best known for hosting the tabloid talk show Jerry Springer between September 30, 1991, and July 26, 2018, and debuting the Jerry Springer Podcast in 2015. From 2007 to 2008, Springer hosted America's Got Talent, and from September 2019 until 2022, Springer hosted the courtroom show Judge Jerry.

Early life
Gerald Norman Springer was born in the London Underground station of Highgate while the station was in use as a shelter from German bombing during World War II, and grew up on Chandos Road, East Finchley. His parents, Margot (a bank clerk) and Richard Springer (owner of a shoe shop), were German-Jewish refugees who escaped from Landsberg an der Warthe, Prussia (now Gorzów Wielkopolski, Poland). His maternal grandmother, Marie Kallmann, who was left behind, died in the gas vans of Chełmno extermination camp (German-occupied Poland). His paternal grandmother, Selma Springer (née Elkeles), died at the hospital in the Theresienstadt concentration camp (German-occupied Czechoslovakia). Selma Springer's brother, Hermann Elkeles, was a renowned Berlin doctor who also died at Theresienstadt concentration camp.

In January 1949, at the age of four, Springer immigrated with his parents to the United States, settling in the Kew Gardens neighborhood of Queens, New York City. He attended nearby Forest Hills High School. One of his earliest memories about current events was when he was 12 and watching the 1956 Democratic National Convention on television where he saw and was impressed by John F. Kennedy.

Education and pre-political career
Springer earned a B.A. degree from Tulane University in 1965, majoring in political science. He earned a J.D. degree from Northwestern University in 1968.

Springer became a political campaign adviser to Democrat Robert F. Kennedy. Following Kennedy's assassination, he began practicing law at the Cincinnati law firm of Frost & Jacobs, now Frost Brown Todd.

Springer was a partner in the law firm of Grinker, Sudman & Springer from 1973 to 1985, alongside former NBA agent Ronnie Grinker (d. 1997) and current Butler County, Ohio, magistrate Harry Sudman.

Political and journalist career
In 1970, Springer ran for Congress. He failed to unseat incumbent Republican Donald D. Clancy, but took 45% of the vote in a traditionally Republican district. He had previously spearheaded the effort to lower the voting age, including testifying before the Senate Judiciary Committee in support of ratification of the 26th Amendment.  Three days after announcing his candidacy, Springer, who was also an Army reservist at the time, was called to active duty and stationed at Fort Knox. He resumed his campaign after he was discharged.

Springer was elected to the Cincinnati City Council in 1971. He resigned in 1974 after admitting to soliciting a prostitute. Springer came clean at a press conference. Long-time Cincinnati newsman Al Schottelkotte pronounced Springer's career over, but Springer's honesty helped him win back his seat in 1975 by a landslide. In a post-election interview, Schottelkotte good-naturedly reminded Springer that he had declared Springer's career over. Springer told the newsman, "I'm glad that you were wrong."

In 1977, he was chosen to serve one year as mayor by the city council. Springer could only serve one year as mayor due to a political arrangement at the time (Cincinnati has since changed to direct election of its mayor) that required the Democrats to split the mayoral term with a local third party group, the Charter Committee, with whom the Democrats governed in an electoral alliance. In the city council and as mayor, Springer supported changing the local election system so that council members would be elected by districts (thus better representing neighborhood interests) instead of "9X" at-large system, but his efforts (as well as those of everyone else, to date, who has supported such a change) did not meet with success.

In 1982, Springer sought the Democratic nomination for governor of Ohio. TV commercials for Springer's campaign referenced his use of a check to pay a prostitute, saying that he was not afraid of the truth "even if it hurts". He failed to win the Democratic party's nomination—finishing a distant third behind former lieutenant governor Richard F. Celeste and Ohio Attorney General William J. Brown, and his political career was put on hold. In the late 1980s, he played a major role in saving the historic Cincinnati Union Terminal.

Springer considered running for the United States Senate in 2000 and 2004, but he backed down due to negative associations with Jerry Springer. He also considered running in the 2018 Ohio gubernatorial election, but decided against it due to his age.

Springer's broadcast career started while he was an undergraduate at Tulane University, on WTUL New Orleans FM, a progressive format college radio station. It continued while he was still mayor of Cincinnati, with album-oriented rock radio station WEBN-FM, which was noted for its laid-back and irreverent radio format. The station featured commentaries by Springer under the banner "The Springer Memorandum." The popularity of these commentaries launched his broadcasting career.

Springer was hired as a political reporter and commentator on Cincinnati's NBC affiliate, WLWT, which had, at the time, the lowest-rated news program. Later, having been named primary news anchor and managing editor, he needed a broadcast catchphrase in the model of other great newsmen. With the help of some others at WLWT, he created his signature line: "Take care of yourself, and each other." Within two years he was Cincinnati's number-one news anchor, along with partner Norma Rashid. For five years, he was the most popular one in the city, garnering ten local Emmy Awards for his nightly commentaries, which were frequently satirized by Cincinnati radio personality Gary Burbank. Those commentaries would eventually become his "Final Thought" on Jerry Springer. Springer would remain commentator at WLWT until January 1993. He resided in Loveland, Ohio, during this time.

In 1997, the Chicago-based NBC-owned station WMAQ-TV hired Springer to serve as a news commentator. However, this proved to be unpopular among viewers, as it resulted in the resignation of long-time news anchors Ron Magers and Carol Marin. After performing only two commentaries, Springer resigned as commentator.

Broadcasting career

Jerry Springer (1991–2018)

Jerry Springer debuted on September 30, 1991. It was developed by WLWT to mimic the format and look of fellow talk show The Phil Donahue Show, all the way down to Jerry's haircut and glasses, making him look like Phil Donahue (both were produced by Multimedia Entertainment). It started as a politically oriented talk show, a longer version of Springer's commentaries. Guests included Oliver North and Jesse Jackson, and topics included homelessness and gun politics.

In early 1994, Springer and his new producer, Richard Dominick, revamped the show's format in order to garner higher ratings. The show became more successful as it became targeted toward tabloidish sensationalism. Guests were everyday people confronted on a television stage by a spouse or family member's adultery, homosexuality, prostitution, transvestism, hate group membership, or other controversial situations.  These confrontations were often promoted by scripted shouting or violence on stage. The show received substantial ratings and much attention. By 1998, it was beating The Oprah Winfrey Show in many cities, and was reaching more than 6.7 million viewers.

On July 10, 2002, the sons of guest Nancy Campbell-Panitz – who was murdered by her ex-husband after they appeared on a May 2000 episode with his girlfriend – filed suit in Sarasota County against Springer, his producers, and his distributor, claiming he created "a mood that led to murder." Ultimately, the estate of Campbell-Panitz dropped all monetary claims against Jerry Springer and the show agreed to waive its claims for malicious prosecution against the personal representative of the estate of Campbell-Panitz and his counsel.

In 2005, a UK version of the show aired on Britain's ITV network titled The Springer Show. A subdued and more tongue-in-cheek version of the U.S. show, it beat its talk-show rival Trisha Goddard five to one in the ratings.

The VH1 "celebreality" series The Springer Hustle, which took a look at how Jerry Springer is produced, premiered in April 2007.

In April 2015, Springer debuted The Jerry Springer Podcast on his website, JerrySpringer.com. It is also broadcast in the UK on Talkradio, on Sundays at midnight.  Springer is the second American talk show host to travel to Cuba, after Conan O'Brien, for the Jerry Springer Podcast.

On July 26, 2018, Jerry Springer aired its final episode in syndication after 27 seasons before it began airing reruns on The CW on September 10, 2018.

Judge Jerry (2019–2022)

Springer debuted a new courtroom show, Judge Jerry, on September 9, 2019. The show gave him the opportunity to host a more "grown-up" program and to use his law school education. On March 9, 2022, the series was canceled after three seasons.

Other

Springer hosted America's Got Talent on NBC for its second and third seasons, replacing Regis Philbin, before leaving to concentrate on other projects.

From January 17, 2005, to December 5, 2006, Springer hosted Springer on the Radio, a liberal talk show on Cincinnati's WCKY-AM. He did the show from the Clear Channel studios in Kenwood on Mondays, Thursdays, and Fridays, and in Chicago (where his television show taped at the time) on Tuesdays and Wednesdays. Air America Radio syndicated the program for most of the show's run.

He hosted Miss World in 2000 and 2001 and the Miss Universe 2008. He was also the guest host for WWE Raw on February 15, 2010, at Wells Fargo Arena in Des Moines, Iowa. Springer has also hosted The Price Is Right Live!.

From 2010 to 2015, Springer hosted a dating game show called Baggage, which aired on GSN.

In July 2012, he hosted ''Price is Right Live!'' in Vancouver's Boulevard Casino. He hosted the show at Jack Cincinnati Casino in 2018.

From January 2014, Springer hosted Investigation Discovery series Tabloid.

He hosted The Adam Carolla Show on April 25, 2014, where he sat in for Adam Carolla.

Springer guest hosted the 22nd-season premiere episode of WWE Raw on September 8, 2014, in an attempt to conduct an intervention with The Bella Twins.

Springer hosted the show Jerry Springer Presents WWE Too Hot For TV on the WWE Network in 2015.

UK 
After a few years of his U.S. talk show being broadcast in the UK, ITV approached Springer, who temporarily co-hosted This Morning with Judy Finnigan in March 1999 and again in 2000. In summer 1999, ITV made 12 episodes of the UK-based version of the series, Jerry Springer UK, filmed at the same studios as his US show.

In September 1999, Springer made a pilot for a Letterman-style talk show for ITV called Jerry Springer on Sunday. The show received good reviews and ratings and a further four episodes were commissioned to be broadcast in May 2000.  Five were actually broadcast during May and June 2000 under the name Springer.

The series was picked up by Channel 5 and renamed Late Night with Jerry Springer. Two series were made in 2000 and 2001 with 16 episodes.  While working for Channel 5 In 2001, he was the host of the UK version of Greed, and a stand in host for The Wright Stuff.  On April 16, 2006, Springer was the guest host for the opening show for the third series of The Friday Night Project for Channel 4 and guest hosted Have I Got News for You on December 12, 2008. In 2007, he was the host of Nothing But the Truth, the UK version of Nada más que la verdad.

Springer covered the 2016 United States presidential election for ITV's Good Morning Britain.

In 2016, 2017 and 2018, he guest hosted three episodes of the BBC's The One Show with TV host Alex Jones.

In the media

Acting
Springer appeared in an episode of Married... with Children as the host of a talk show called The Masculine Feminist, in which he advocated for women getting the men's bowling night and eventually taking over at a bowling alley. Al Bundy and his friends tie Springer to a chair and take over his show with a stripper who jumps up and down for the crowd's delight.

Springer starred in the 1998 film Ringmaster as a talk show host largely based on himself, though named "Jerry Farrelly". Ringmaster offers a behind-the-scenes look at would-be guests who apply to a Springer-like show. The same year, Springer also released an unrelated autobiography named Ringmaster. He quipped, "I can only think of one title a year."

In 2004 he played the US president in The Defender, directed by Dolph Lundgren.

He was in several episodes of George Lopez as Benny Lopez's ex-boyfriend Wayne and made a July 2007 guest appearance on Days of Our Lives as "Pete", a high roller in Las Vegas who helped Nick Fallon win $50,000. On October 19, 2007, Springer made a cameo appearance on Late Night with Conan O'Brien as a "random" audience member.

In June 2012, he appeared in Chicago at the Cambridge Theatre London as Billy Flynn for a short period of time, starring alongside Aoife Mulholland and Leigh Zimmerman.

He had a cameo appearance as himself in episode 2 of the Netflix show Happy!.

In 1996, he appeared on an episode of the ninth season of Roseanne and on The X-Files episode "The Post-Modern Prometheus". In 1998, he voiced a cartoon version of himself in the "Starship Poopers" segment of The Simpsons Halloween episode, Treehouse of Horror IX. That same year, he appeared as himself on an episode of The Wayans Bros.. In 1999, he appeared in the episode "Mrs. Kraft" of the third season of Sabrina the Teenage Witch with his talk show. That same year, he was in an episode of Space Ghost Coast to Coast. He made a cameo appearance in Austin Powers: The Spy Who Shagged Me (1999) as himself during an episode of his show featuring Dr. Evil and his estranged son Scott Evil. In 2001, he appeared as a claymation version of himself in an episode Gary & Mike with a parody of his talk show. In 2007, he appeared on episode No. 1301 of MADtv as himself.

Television appearances
Springer has been a guest in the following shows: the UK daytime programme The Paul O'Grady Show on Channel 4 on November 12, 2007, Question Time on June 19, 2008, Saturday Kitchen on June 21, 2008, along with chef Theresa Griegson and Kristin Dawson, Verdict with Dan Abrams in June 2008, two appearances on Whose Line Is It Anyway? in 2003 (from the same taping), The Jason Ellis Show on June 20, 2008, Desert Island Discs on November 1, 2009, Hell's Kitchen on October 13, 2010, and Drop the Mic on April 15, 2018.

In 2009, he appeared as a guest on the British game show Countdown. Springer appeared on the Chris Moyles Show in April 2009, along with Davina McCall and Alan Carr. On May 31, 2009, Springer was a guest on The Andrew Marr Show talking about politics and his upcoming projects.

He was interviewed by satirist Chris Morris in his surreal radio series Blue Jam (Series 2, Episode 6). On January 23, 2004, Springer was featured in an episode of This American Life titled "Leaving the Fold".

In late 2006, Springer was a contestant on the third season of Dancing with the Stars, with his professional dance partner, Kym Johnson. He wanted to appear on the show so he could learn the waltz for the wedding of his daughter, Katie. Springer and Johnson were eliminated in the seventh week of competition.

Springer appeared in an episode of BBC One's television series Who Do You Think You Are? on August 27, 2008. In the episode he traveled to Poland, where he discovered that his maternal grandmother had been sent to Chełmno extermination camp by the Nazis and killed. His paternal grandmother died at Theresienstadt concentration camp in what is the Czech Republic. He wept openly when he learned of how they died.

He has been a guest panellist on episodes of 8 Out of 10 Cats in 2014, Through the Keyhole in 2015, and QI ("Noodles") in 2017.

In 2022, Springer competed in season eight of The Masked Singer as "Beetle". He was eliminated on "Muppet Night" alongside Kat Graham as "Robo-Girl".

Other projects

In 1995, Springer recorded the album Dr. Talk for Fiddle Fish Records, which mostly consisted of country music covers.

On May 16, 2008, Springer delivered the Northwestern University School of Law commencement address. Although many students had criticized the university's choice of speaker, he received a standing ovation from about half the audience and reviews of his speech were generally positive. He later stated that his speech was about "the ethical judgments we all have to make in whatever business we go [into]".

Springer is the executive producer of The Steve Wilkos Show, which is hosted by Steve Wilkos, the long-time head of security on Springer's own talk show.

In 2018, Springer sat in and performed 6 songs, ranging from Elvis to the Tennessee Waltz, with the Lazybirds, an American Roots Music band based out of Black Mountain, NC.

References

Bibliography

Books
 Springer, Jerry and Laura Morton.  Ringermaster. St. Martin's Press, 1998.
 Springer, Jerry and Richard Dominick.  Jerry Springers Wildest Shows Ever.  Harper Paperbacks, 1999.

Other
 Rebecca Johnson and Kathleen Powers, "Jerry Springer under Siege", Good Housekeeping, September 1998, pp. 114–119.
 John Kieswetter. "Springer ready to take radio show national". The Cincinnati Enquirer. March 21, 2005. D1.
 Allison J. Waldman, "American Pie: The In-Your-Face Success of 'The Jerry Springer Show'", TelevisionWeek, May 8, 2006, p. 31.
 Sharon Waxman. "King of the Trash Heap; Jerry Springer Digs the Dirt on Television". Washington Post, January 20, 1998, p. D1.

External links

 
 
 Finding Aid for Jerry Springer papers, Archives and Rare Books Library, University of Cincinnati, Cincinnati, Ohio
 

1944 births
Living people
English emigrants to the United States
Actors from Sarasota, Florida
American actor-politicians
American game show hosts
American people of German-Jewish descent
American podcasters
American Ashkenazi Jews
American television talk show hosts
Television anchors from Chicago
Cincinnati City Council members
Television anchors from Cincinnati
Television personalities from Cincinnati
Jewish mayors of places in the United States
Jewish American musicians
Jewish singers
Mayors of Cincinnati
Lawyers from Cincinnati
Military personnel from Cincinnati
Northwestern University Pritzker School of Law alumni
Ohio Democrats
Male actors from Chicago
People from Loveland, Ohio
People from Highgate
People from Kew Gardens, Queens
Actors from London
Journalists from London
Tulane University alumni
United States Army soldiers
Writers from Chicago
Journalists from New York City
Journalists from Ohio
20th-century American journalists
American male journalists
20th-century American male actors
20th-century American politicians
21st-century American male actors
Forest Hills High School (New York) alumni
Jewish American people in Ohio politics
Candidates in the 1970 United States elections
Television judges
21st-century American Jews